Richland County is located in the U.S. state of South Carolina. As of the 2020 census, its population was 416,147, making it the second-most populous county in South Carolina, behind only Greenville County. The county seat and largest city is Columbia, the state capital. The county was established on March 12, 1785. Richland County is part of the Columbia, SC metropolitan statistical area. In 2010, the center of population of South Carolina was located in Richland County, in the city of Columbia.

History

Richland County was probably named for its "rich land". The county was formed in 1785 as part of the large Camden District. A small part of Richland County was later ceded to adjacent Kershaw County in 1791. The county seat and largest city is Columbia, which is also the state capital. In 1786, the state legislature decided to move the capital from Charleston to a more central location. A site was chosen in Richland County, which is in the geographic center of the state, and a new town was laid out. Richland County's boundaries were formally incorporated on December 18, 1799. Cotton from the surrounding plantations was shipped through Columbia and later manufactured into textiles there. General William T. Sherman captured Columbia during the Civil War and his troops burned the town and parts of the county on February 17, 1865. The U. S. Army returned on friendlier terms in 1917, when Fort Jackson was established, which is now the largest and most active Initial Entry Training Center in the U.S. Army. The South Carolina State House is located in downtown Columbia.

Geography 

Richland County is situated in the center of South Carolina.

National protected area
 Congaree National Park

State and local protected areas/sites 
 Harbison State Forest
 Riverbanks Zoo and Garden
 Sesquicentennial State Park
 South Carolina State Fair

Major water bodies
 Broad River
 Congaree River
 Lake Murray
 Little River
 Saluda River
 Wateree River

Adjacent counties
 Kershaw County - northeast
 Fairfield County - north
 Sumter County - east
 Lexington County - west
 Calhoun County - south
 Newberry County - northwest

Transportation

Bus system

Public transportation in Richland County is provided by the COMET, or officially the Central Midlands Regional Transit Authority (CMRTA). The bus system is the main public transit system for the greater Columbia area. In Richland County, the bus system runs in the areas of Columbia, Forest Acres, Fort Jackson, Irmo, St. Andrews, Northeast Richland, Lower Richland, and Eastover. Additionally, COMET offers Dial-a-ride transit (DART), which provides personalized service passengers with disabilities.

Railway
Columbia has one Amtrak station (CLB) that serves over 30,000 passengers per year on the Silver Star rail line. Additionally, Richland County has an operating facility for CSX Transportation, a company that transports over one million carloads of freight on South Carolina's rail network.

Airports
The Jim Hamilton–L.B. Owens Airport operates over 56,000 aircraft annually, but is a smaller airport used mostly for small and private planes. The main airport for the region is the Columbia Metropolitan Airport, which is located in neighboring Lexington County. In 2018, the Columbia Metro Airport served 1,197,603 passengers with 12,324 flights.

Interstates
 Interstate 20 travels from west to east and connects Columbia to Atlanta and Augusta in the west and Florence in the east.  It serves the nearby towns and suburbs of Pelion, Lexington, West Columbia, Sandhill, Pontiac, and Elgin.  Interstate 20 is also used by travelers heading to Myrtle Beach, although the interstate's eastern terminus is in Florence.
 Interstate 26 travels from northwest to southeast and connects the Columbia area to the other two major population centers of South Carolina - the Greenville-Spartanburg area in the northwestern part of the state and North Charleston – Charleston area in the southeastern part of the state.
 Interstate 77 begins in Lexington county and ends in Cleveland, Ohio, and is frequently used by travelers on the east coast heading to or from Florida.
 Interstate 126 branches off from I-26 and leads into downtown Columbia and provides access to Riverbanks Zoo.

U.S. routes

State routes

Major infrastructure 
 Columbia Station
 Fort Jackson
 McEntire Joint National Guard Base - U.S. Air Force base

Demographics

2020 census

As of the 2020 United States census, 416,147 people, 153,484 households, and 90,802 families were residing in the county.

2010 census
As of the 2010 United States Census, 384,504 people, 145,194 households, and 89,357 families were residing in the county. The racial makeup of the county was 45.3% White, 48.9% African American, 2.2% Asian, 0.3% American Indian, 0.1% Pacific Islander, 1.9% from other races, and 2.2% from two or more races. Those of Hispanic or Latino origin made up 4.8% of the population. In terms of ancestry, 9.6% were German, 8.6% were English, 7.6% were Irish, and 7.1% were American.

Of the 145,194 households, 32.9% had children under 18 living with them, 39.6% were married couples living together, 17.7% had a female householder with no husband present, 38.5% were not families, and 30.2% of all households were made up of individuals. The average household size was 2.43, and the average family size was 3.05. The median age was 32.6 years.

The median income for a household in the county was $47,922 and for a family was $61,622. Males had a median income of $42,453 versus $34,012 for females. The per capita income for the county was $25,805. About 10.0% of families and 14.5% of the population were below the poverty line, including 17.6% of those under age 18 and 9.7% of those age 65 or over.

Law and government

Richland County is governed by a county council,  who hold concurrent four-year terms.  Richland County is governed under the Council-Administrator form of government, which is very similar to the council-manager form of government.  The major difference between the council-manager and council-administrator forms of government is the title of the chief executive.

The South Carolina Department of Corrections, headquartered in Columbia and in Richland County, operates several correctional facilities in Columbia and in Richland County. They include the Broad River Correctional Institution, the Goodman Correctional Institution, the Camille Griffin Graham Correctional Institution, the Stevenson Correctional Institution, and the Campbell Pre-Release Center. Graham houses the state's female death row. The State of South Carolina execution chamber is located at Broad River. From 1990 to 1997 Broad River housed the state's male death row.

In March 2008, the Richland County Sheriff's Department acquired an armored personnel carrier equipped with a .50 caliber machine gun. Reason magazine criticized the acquisition as "overkill".

Politics
Richland County was one of the first areas of South Carolina to break away from a Solid South voting pattern. From 1948 to 1988, it only supported the official Democratic candidate for president once, in 1976. It voted for splinter Dixiecrat Strom Thurmond in 1948, and for unpledged electors in 1956.

Since 1992, Richland County has been one of the stronger Democratic bastions in South Carolina, following the trend of most urban counties across the country.

Education

Public Primary and Secondary Education

Colleges and Universities

Public library

Healthcare

Attractions

 Congaree National Park
 Fort Jackson National Cemetery
 Harbison State Forest
 Lake Murray
 Palmetto Trail
 Richland Library
 Riverbanks Zoo
 Sesquicentennial State Park
 South Carolina State Fair
 South Carolina State Museum

Top employers

Communities

Unincorporated communities and neighborhoods

 Boyden Arbor
 Cedar Creek
 Eau Claire
 Fairwold Acres
 Horrell Hill
 Killian
 Kingville
 Leesburg
 Lykes
 Mountain Brook
 Pontiac
 Riverside
 Spring Hill
 State Park
 Wateree
 Windsor Estates

Regions
 Dutch Fork
 Fort Jackson
 Intown/downtown
 Lower Richland
 Northeast Richland
 Upper Richland

In popular culture

Richland County was one of several counties across the country used as a filming location for the A&E reality documentary series Live PD, which worked in collaboration with the Richland County Sheriff's Department. The show first premiered in 2016 and aired for four years until its cancellation in 2020. In 2021, Sheriff Leon Lott said the show will return to Richland County in the future.

See also

 List of counties in South Carolina
 National Register of Historic Places listings in Richland County, South Carolina
 South Carolina State Parks
 List of South Carolina state forests
 National Park Service
 Birch County, South Carolina, proposed county that would include existing portions of Richland County
 Eastern Cherokee, Southern Iroquois, and United Tribes of South Carolina, state-recognized group that resides in the county
 Natchez Indian Tribe of South Carolina, state-recognized group that resides in the county

Notes

References

External links

 
 

 
1785 establishments in South Carolina
Columbia metropolitan area (South Carolina)
Majority-minority counties in South Carolina
Populated places established in 1785